Clapperton Island is located in Northwest Territories, Canada, within Franklin Bay. The island was named by John Franklin in honour of the explorer, Hugh Clapperton. It is composed of limestone and is skirted by detached rocks.

References

Uninhabited islands of the Northwest Territories